Marc-Henri Wajnberg is a Belgian film director born in 1953. He is also a screenwriter, an actor and the co-founder and CEO of Wajnbrosse Productions.

His productions are eclectic, overall he has made 2800 very short films – including the famous collection Clapman broadcast worldwide during years. His short film, Le Réveil  (The Alarm Clock) starring Jean-Claude Dreyfus was awarded in Cannes and received 22 awards around the world.

He directed and produced numerous documentaries including Oscar Niemeyer, An architect committed to his century, and Evgueni Khaldei, photographer under Stalin which were awarded in several international film festivals. He coproduced a Lars Von Trier movie, The Five Obstructions, and directed two long features; Just Friends (1995) and Kinshasa Kids (2012) which premiered at the 69th Venice International Film Festival.

His films have amassed over 70 international awards.

Filmography 
 1978: Writes, directs and produces Happy as a child in water – Documentary – 50' on the birth of violence
 1980–1981: Writes, directs, plays and produces Professor Adelard – Children's series on amusing physics, 12 episodes of 3'30"
 1983: Writes, directs and produces the collection CLAP – 1200 shorts of 8", broadcast daily for several years in 50 countries
 1984: Co-writes and co-directs with Eric Angelini Fume, c'est du belge (The Return) – 10' 
 1985: Writes, directs, plays and produces Flash Back - 8' feature film project
 1987: Writes, directs and produces for Canal+ Three-cushion billiards – 26' documentary with Josse de Pauw,  featuring the world champion Ludo Dielis and runner-up Richard Bitalis
 1988: 
 Co-writes and co-directs with Eric Angelini Fume, c'est du belge (The series) - 4x5'
 Directs the short film The family Picnic - 7' with Eve Bonfanti, Francine Lafineuse, Patrick Walleffe
 1989:
 Writes, directs and produces the collection Wolinski – 40x20" sexy cartoon series based on the drawings of Georges Wolinski
 Writes and directs the collection Les derniers philosophes – 50x2' live series based on the drawings of Georges Wolinski
 Writes and directs most of the films for the launching of Canal+ Belgium : The first three minutes, The decoders, Les ricains, The directors
 1990–1991: Writes, directs and produces the collection Mr Almaniak – 365x50" series, broadcast daily for several years in 25 countries
 1992–1993: Writes, directs and produces the feature-length film Just Friends starring Charles Berling, Josse De Pauw, Ann-Gisel Glass and Sylvie Milhaud
 1996: Writes, directs and produces the short film The Alarm Clock (Le Réveil) – 7' with Jean-Claude Dreyfus
 1997: Writes, directs and produces the documentary Evgueni Khaldei, photographer under Stalin – 59'
 1998–1999: 
 Writes, directs and produces the documentary Around the world in 80 beers – 58' with Jean-Claude Dreyfus and Marc-Henri Wajnberg
 Writes and directs two commercials (30’’ and 45’’): Tango as part of the advertising campaign Parisienne People by famous directors (David Lynch, Jean-Luc Godard, Emir Kusturica, Enki Bilal, Giuseppe Tornatore, Marc-Henri Wajnberg, The Coen brothers, Roman Polanski, Wim Wenders, Robert Altman, …)
 Writes and directs four commercials for the Swiss cigarette brand Sélect  – 15"
 2000: Writes, directs and produces the documentary Oscar Niemeyer, an architect committed to his century - 59'
 2001-2002-2003: 
 Co-produces the feature-length film The five obstructions by Lars Von Trier and Joergen Leth
 Conceives and produces Kaleidoscope, looking at life frames - 33x26' documentary series
 Writes and directs The Cruiseliner "SS Norway,"  Caribbean #3 – Coll. Kaleidoscope, 26'
 Writes and directs Galeries Royales Saint-Hubert in Brussels #1 – Coll. Kaleidoscope, 26'
 Writes and directs Vite lu, bien lu – commercials for Swiss Newspaper "Le Matin"
 2004-2005-2006:
 Writes, directs and produces Bollywood-Mumbai India #33 – Coll. Kaleidoscope, 26'
 Writes, directs and produces Nanotechnologia, the movie – 26' fiction/documentary on the revolution of nanosciences
 Writes, directs and produces Denpasser market, Bali, Indonesia #21 – Coll. Kaleidoscope, 26'
 2007-2008-2009:
 Writes, directs and produces BAF! – 6' fiction
 Writes, directs and produces La ligne (The line) – series of 1000 shorts of 11 seconds – animation
 Screenwriting of the feature-length film San Mao
 2010-2011-2012:
 Writes, directs and produces Kinshasa Kids - 86' feature-length film
 Writes, directs and produces Portrait of Kinshasa - Web-documentary for ARTE
 Concert captation Drumming, un concert de Music Fund 
 2013-2014-2015:
 Co-writes with Eric Angelini the feature-length film The Perfect Movie - 90'
 Writes and develops the documentary series Fêtes folles dans un monde fou - 6x26'
 Writes, directs and produces the documentary Sorcerer children, Kinshasa – 52' (France Télévision)
 2016–2017:
 Writes, develops and directs the documentary series Stolen Childhood – 5x26'
 Creates and produces the essay of the VR 360° transmedia experience Being a Shégué
 Develops the Kinshasa Now platform and the VR experience Being a Shégué
 Develops the feature-length film The Perfect Movie – 90’
 Writes and develops the TV series SQUAT

Awards

Sorcerer children of Kinshasa 

 Public Award – Ciné Droit Libre Festival – Ouagadougou – Burkina Faso – 2014
 Special Mention of the Jury -  Ciné Droit Libre Festival – Ouagadougou – Burkina Faso – 2014

Kinshasa Kids 

 Human Rights Award – received in Strasbourg and given by 8 ambassadors 
 Public choice Award for Best Film – Bucharest Film Festival – Romania – 2013 
 Special acknowledgment for « Man and his environment » - Festroia Festival – Portugal – 2013 
 Award for Best Foreign Language film – Ecrans Noirs Film Festival – Yaoundé – Cameroon – 2013 
 Coup de Cœur – Marrakech International Film Festival – Morocco – 2013 
 Prix Humanum – Union of Belgian Film Critics – Belgium – 2014 
 Best Editing Award - Magritte Award – Belgium – 2014 
 Nominated for best film - Magritte Award – Belgium – 2014
Selected in 60 festivals (Venice, Toronto, Busan, New York, ...)

The Five Obstructions 

 Best Documentary – Durban International Film Festival – South Africa – 2004 
 Gold Dok of the Year – Gulddok – Copenhagen – Denmark – 2004 
 Grand Prize – Odense International Film Festival – Denmark – 2004
 Jury Prize – FIPRESCI – Zagreb Motovun Film Festival – Hungary – 2004 
Selected in 95 festivals

Nanotechnologie, le film 
 Price of Czech Ministry of education for Youth & Physical Training – Technfilm – 2003
 Silver Book – 33rd Roshd International Film Festival – 2003

Oscar Niemeyer, an architect committed to his century 

 First Prize – International Festival of Film on Architecture : « Archfilm 2004 » – Bratislava – Slovakia 2004
 People’s choice Award – Kiev Festival – Ukraine – 2004 
 Best Director of Photography – Thunderbird International Film Festival – USA – 2002 
 Best Professional Documentary – Thunderbird International Film Festival – USA – 2002 
 Best Documentary - Los Charales Awards – Ajijic International Film Festival – Mexico – 2001 
 Best Documentary – Sydney Changing Images International Film Festival – Australia – 2001 
 Silver Screen – U.S. International Film and Video Festival – Elmhurst, Illinois – USA – 2001 
 Grand Prize FIFA – 19th International Festival of Film on Art – Montréal – Canada – 2001 
 Bronze medal – 41st Monte-Carlo Festival – France – 2001 
 Gran Premio « DOCUMANIA » – Madrid – Spain – 2000 
 Gran Premio – Muestra Intl De Patrimonio Arquitectonico – Alcala – Spain – 2000 
 First Prize – Made in Europe Documentary Festival – Strasbourg – France – 2000 
 People’s choice Award – Made in Europe Documentary Festival – Strasbourg – France – 2000

Evgueni Khaldei, photographer under Stalin 

 First Prize - Rhode Island International Film Festival – USA – 2000
 Silver Spire - Golden Gate Awards, San Francisco International Film Festival – USA – 1998
 Grand Prix - Taiwan International Documentary Festival – Taiwan – 1998

Le Réveil (The Alarm Clock) 

 Grand Prize - Potsdam Film Festival - Germany – 1996
 Best Short Film - International Festival of Comedy Film – Vevey - Switzerland – 1996
 Best Comedy Short - Palm Springs International Short Film Festival - USA - 1996
 Best Direction – Capalbio International Short Film Festival – Italy - 1996
 Public Award - Capalbio International Short Film Festival - Italy - 1996
 French Community Award - Namur International Film Festival – Belgium - 1996
 Silver Palm - Huy International Short Film Festival - Belgium - 1996
 Best Actor - Huy International Short Film Festival - Belgium - 1996
 Best Direction - Bucharest International Short Film Festival - Romania – 1996
 Youth Award - Stains Youth Short Film Festival - France - 1997
 Free Style Short Film Award - St-Ouen Train Film Festival - France - 1997
 Public Award - Beauvais International Film Festival - France - 1998
 Best Absurd Fiction – Mediawave Festival – Gyor - Hungaria - 1998
 Best International Short Film - Wine Country Film Festival - USA - 1998
 Grand Prize – Badalona International Short Film Festival – Spain – 2001
 Public Award – Badalona International Short Film Festival – Spain – 2001
 Golden Croissant – “Breakfast Cinema” Brussels – 2001
 Best Distributed Film in TVB’s FILMETS Program – FILMETS International Film Festival – Badalona – Spain – 2002

Just Friends 

 Belgian entry for Best Foreign Language Film at The Oscars – USA – 1994
 André Cavens Award – Union of Belgian Film Critics – Belgium – 1993 
 Best Film – La Baule Film Festival – France – 1993 
 Best Actor Josse De Pauw – La Baule Film Festival – France – 1993 
 Youth Award – Best Belgian Film – Belgium – 1993 
 Femina Award – City of Brussels – Belgium – 1993 
 Philip Morris Movie Club Award – Best screenplay – Belgium – 1993 
 Best first film – Montevideo Film Festival – Uruguay – 1994 
 Grand Prix – Aosta Valley Film Festival – Italy – 1994 
 Joseph Plateau Award – Best Belgian Film at Gand Festival – Belgium – 1994 
 Joseph Plateau Award – Best Actor at Gand Festival – Belgium – 1994 
 Joseph Plateau Award – Best Director at Gand Festival – Belgium – 1994 
 Gran Premio – Sorrento International Film Festival – Italy – 1994 
 CD soundtrack of the month elected by Jazz in Time – December 1993

Clapman 
 Gold Award – International Film and TV Festival of New York – USA – 1984
 Crystal Antanenna – Best program – Brussels – 1985
 Gold Award – Creative Club of Belgium – 1985
 Special Prize for Short Film - Mostra Internacional de Sao Paulo – 1986
 Special prize, Funny Film festival Boario – 1987
Special guest in more than 20 festivals.

Happy as a child in water 

 Psychology Award – International Scientific Film Festival – Brussels – 1982

Fume, c'est du belge 
 Best Editing - Super 8 International Film Festival of Brussels – Belgium – 1975

Others

Teacher 

1986 and 1987 – at the ERG (School of graphic research) in Brussels – Belgium

1994 and 2013 – at the EICTV (Escuela Internacional de Cine y TV) San Antonio de Los Banos – Cuba

2013 – Acting teacher in Kinshasa – Democratic Republic of Congo

Jury 

1998 – Festival du film de Genève « Star de demain » – Switzerland

2002 – President of the jury of Festival International du Film sur L’Art – Montréal – Canada

2011 – Festival du Film Fantastique de Brussels – Belgium

2015 – President of the 48H Film Project – Brussels – Belgium

Member of commissions 

2003 to 2004  – President du CFA (Centre du Film sur l’Art) – Brussels – Belgium

2002 to 2005  – Member of the Commission Cinéma – Belgium

2013 to 2015  – Member of the Commission Cinéma – Belgium

Since 1997 – Member of the UPFF (Union des Producteurs de films) – Belgium

Since 2007 – Honorary member of CBA (Centre de l’Audiovisuel) – Belgium

2000 to 2006   – Producer of promotional spots for the European Commission.

References

External links
 

1953 births
Belgian film directors
Belgian screenwriters
Living people